Tankosiq is a village in Ferizaj Municipality, Kosovo. According to the Kosovo Agency of Statistics (KAS) estimate from the 2011 census, there were 2,096 people residing in Tankosiq, with Albanians constituting the majority of the population.

History
During World War II, the village's Serb population was subjected to expulsions, murders and pillaging by Albanian paramilitaries.

Notes

References 

Villages in Ferizaj